Donald Marc Halperin (July 25, 1945 – June 26, 2006) was an American lawyer and politician from New York.

Early life
He was born on July 25, 1945, the son of Charles Halperin and Gladys Halperin. He attended Abraham Lincoln High School. He graduated from Rutgers University in 1967, and from Brooklyn Law School in 1970. He married Brenda, and they had two children. While still in law school, he entered politics as a Democrat.

Career
Halperin was a member of the New York State Senate from 1971 to 1993, sitting in the 179th, 180th, 181st, 182nd, 183rd, 184th, 185th, 186th, 187th, 188th, 189th and 190th New York State Legislatures. In September 1993, he ran in the Democratic primary for New York City Public Advocate, but came in fifth among six candidates. On October 4, 1993, Halperin was appointed as New York State Commissioner of the Division of Housing and Community Renewal. He remained in office until the end of 1994. Afterwards Halperin practiced law in New York City.

He was among those who, outnumbered 35 Republicans to 26 Democrat state senators, used a 23 day slowdown until concessions were made by the majority. This was not the only time Halperin was involved in influencing outcomes. In 1971 the New York Civil Liberties Union ranked him the third most liberal member of the legislature's upper house.

Death
He died on June 26, 2006, in the Menorah Nursing Home in Manhattan Beach, Brooklyn, of lung cancer, and was buried at the Mount Lebanon Cemetery in Glendale, Queens.

References

External links
 

1945 births
2006 deaths
Politicians from Brooklyn
Democratic Party New York (state) state senators
Rutgers University alumni
Brooklyn Law School alumni
Deaths from cancer in New York (state)
20th-century American politicians
Abraham Lincoln High School (Brooklyn) alumni